Bill Stouffer (born April 19, 1947) is a farmer and small business owner. He is also currently a Republican member of the Missouri State Senate. He was born in Napton, Missouri and has resided in the 21st District all of his life. He is a graduate of University of Missouri with a degree in agricultural economics.

Personal life
He is the father of two, Bert and Rob, and has four grandchildren. Stouffer and his wife, Sue Ellen, currently live on their family farm near Napton, Missouri in Saline County, where Stouffer has been an active farmer since 1967.

Affiliations
He is a member of Smith Chapel United Methodist Church, the Missouri Cattlemen's Association, the Missouri Farm Bureau, and the National Rifle Association. He is a member, and has served as chairman of the board of MFA, Inc. from 1979 through 1995.  He is the treasurer of Alma Meats, Inc., and a founding member of the state's first Missouri Corn Merchandising Council. Stouffer chairs the University of Missouri's Ag-Alumni Foundation. He served as the board president of the Hardeman R-X School District.

Political career
He was first elected to the Missouri State Senate in 2004, and serves on the following committees:
Agriculture, Conservation, Parks and Natural Resources (vice chair)
Aging, Families, Mental and Public Health
Governmental Accountability and Fiscal Oversight
Transportation (Chairman)

Campaign for Congress
On September 23, 2009, at the Zarda Bar-B-Q in Blue Springs, Senator Stouffer announced his candidacy for U.S. Congress of Missouri's 4th District, currently held by Ike Skelton. In his announcement, he cited the need for an alternative to the "sharp left-turn" of Skelton's 97% liberal voting record. Stouffer faced former State Representative Vicky Hartzler in the Republican primary and lost. Hartzler went on to unseat Skelton.

References
Official Manual, State of Missouri, 2005-2006. Jefferson City, MO:Secretary of State.

"Biography for Senator Stouffer." Missouri State Senate (2010). Retrieved from http://www.senate.mo.gov.

1947 births
Living people
People from Saline County, Missouri
Republican Party Missouri state senators
University of Missouri alumni
Farmers from Missouri
20th-century Methodists
21st-century Methodists
American United Methodists